Sequester is a Canadian heavy metal project created by Ryan Boc in 2005. Ryan Boc remains the sole member, writing and performing all of the material thus far. The music also draws inspiration from other genres such as progressive and psychedelic rock, traditional English and Scottish folk, grunge, alternative rock, blues, jazz, and classical. Common lyrical themes include fantasy, history, folklore, mythology, human nature, and spirituality; they are sung in a clean voice but often with thrashy, more aggressive overtones.  The songs are usually polyphonic, long in duration due to complex structuring and arrangement, and frequently contain harmonized vocal and guitar layering.

Members
 Ryan Boc – vocals, guitar, bass, drums and keyboard

Guest musicians
 Kelli Gose - background vocals on the demo version of Homeland from Visions of the Erlking.

Discography
 Visions of the Erlking (Demo) - 2007
 Winter Shadows - 2008
 Nameless One (EP) - 2009
 Shaping Life and Soul - 2011
 Ancestry (EP) - 2012
 Missing Image - 2014
 Hermit - 2018

Artwork
 The Sequester logo was designed by Andre Guillemette, a Canadian graphic designer notable for working with both Savage Circus and Dark Empire
Cover Art:
 Visions of the Erlking, Winter Shadows, and Shaping Life and Soul featured digital artwork by Ryan Boc. 
 Nameless One was drawn by American artist Jonathan Elliott.
 Ancestry was painted by Ryan's friend and neighbour, Rachel Jackson.

References

External links

 Official site
 Facebook
 CDBaby
 Bandcamp
 YouTube
 MySpace
 Soundclick

Musical groups established in 2005
Musical groups from Victoria, British Columbia
Canadian progressive metal musical groups
Canadian progressive rock groups
Canadian power metal musical groups
Canadian thrash metal musical groups
Canadian folk metal musical groups
Viking metal musical groups
Celtic metal musical groups
2005 establishments in British Columbia